In the 2017–18 season, Partizani Tirana competed in the Kategoria Superiore for the fifth consecutive season. The season was the worst since 2014, because Partizani finished in fifth place, after a disastrous beginning and a bad form during the big part of the season. The club qualified for Europe next season, because of another ban of Skënderbeu from European competitions, this time for 10 years.

First-team squad
Squad at end of season

Left club during season

Competitions

Kategoria Superiore

League table

Results summary

Results by matchday

Matches

Albanian Cup

First round

Second round

Quarter-finals

UEFA Europa League

First qualifying round

Notes

References

External links

Partizani
FK Partizani Tirana seasons
Partizani